Regis Records is a British classical music record label based in Milborne St Andrew, Dorset which is mainly known for re-releases out of print recordings by other, sometimes defunct, British independent labels. The record label is a side business of Selections, a gardening mail order company, and also distributes other labels.

Reissues
Among the notable out of print recordings reissued by Regis are selections from the back catalogues of:
CRD Records
Unicorn-Kanchana
Collins Classics

References

External links
 Regis Records
 Selections.com

Classical music record labels